The Grossmont–Cuyamaca Community College District is a California community college district comprising two colleges, Grossmont College and Cuyamaca College that serve about 28,000 students a year. Grossmont College is located in El Cajon, California and Cuyamaca College is located in Rancho San Diego, California, and primarily serves East San Diego and East County communities.

External links
Official website

California Community Colleges
Education in San Diego County, California
Schools accredited by the Western Association of Schools and Colleges
Education in El Cajon, California
1961 establishments in California
Educational institutions established in 1961